Kettering is a market and industrial town in North Northamptonshire, England. The name means "the place (or territory) of Ketter's people (or kinsfolk)".

In the 2011 census Kettering's built-up area had a population of 63,675. It is part of the East Midlands, along with other towns in Northamptonshire. There is a growing commuter population as it is on the Midland Main Line railway, with East Midlands Railway services direct to London St Pancras International taking about an hour.

Early history
Kettering means "the place (or territory) of Ketter's people (or kinsfolk)". Spelt variously Cytringan, Kyteringas and Keteiringan in the 10th century, although the origin of the name appears to have baffled place-name scholars in the 1930s, words and place-names ending with "-ing" usually derive from the Anglo-Saxon or Old English suffix -inga or -ingas, meaning "the people of the" or "tribe".

Before the Romans, the area, like much of Northamptonshire's prehistoric countryside, appears to have remained somewhat intractable with regards to early human occupation, resulting in an apparently sparse population and relatively few finds from the Palaeolithic, Mesolithic and Neolithic periods. About 500 BC the Iron Age was introduced into the area by a continental people in the form of the Hallstatt culture, and over the next century a series of hillforts were constructed, the closest to Kettering being at nearby Irthlingborough.

Roman
Like most of what later became Northamptonshire, from early in the 1st century BC the Kettering area became part of the territory of the Catuvellauni, a Belgic tribe, the Northamptonshire area forming their most northerly possession. The Catuvellauni were in turn conquered by the Romans in AD 43.

The town traces its origins to an early, unwalled Romano-British settlement, the remnants of which lie under the northern part of the modern town. Occupied until the 4th century, there is evidence that a substantial amount of iron smelting took place on the site. Along with the Forest of Dean and the Weald of Kent and Sussex, this area of Northamptonshire "was one of the three great centres of iron-working in Roman Britain". The settlement reached as far as the Weekley and Geddington parishes. However, it is felt unlikely that the site was continuously occupied from the Romano-British into the Anglo-Saxon era. Pottery kilns have also been unearthed at nearby Barton Seagrave and Boughton.

Saxon
Excavations in the early 20th century either side of Stamford road (A43), near the site of the former Prime Cut factory (now the Warren public house), revealed an extensive early Saxon burial site, consisting of at least a hundred cremation urns dating to the 5th century AD. This suggests that it may have been among the earliest Anglo-Saxon penetrations into the interior of what later became England. The prefix Wic- of the nearby village of Weekley may also signify Anglo-Saxon activities in the area; Greenall reports that it could be "an indication of foederati, Anglo-Saxon mercenaries brought in to boost the defences of the Empire." This was established imperial policy, which the Romano-British continued after Rome withdrew from Britain around 410, with disastrous consequences for the Romano-Britons.

By the 7th century the lands that would eventually become Northamptonshire formed part of the Anglo-Saxon kingdom of Mercia. The Mercians converted to Christianity in 654 with the death of the pagan king Penda. From about 889 the Kettering area, along with much of Northamptonshire (and at one point almost all of England except for Athelney marsh in Somerset), was conquered by the Danes and became part of the Danelaw, with the ancient trackway of Watling Street serving as the border, until being recaptured by the English under the Wessex king Edward the Elder, son of Alfred the Great, in 917. Northamptonshire was conquered again in 940, this time by the Vikings of York, who devastated the area, only for the county to be retaken by the English in 942.

It is unlikely, however, that Kettering itself existed as a village earlier than the 10th century (the county of Northampton itself is not referenced in documents before 1011). Before this time the Kettering area was most likely populated by a thin scattering of family farmsteads. The first historical reference of Kettering is in a charter of 956 in which King Edwy granted ten "cassati" of land to Ælfsige the Goldsmith. The boundaries delineated in this charter would have been recognisable to most inhabitants for the last thousand years and can still be walked today. It is possible that Ælfsige gave Kettering to the monastery of Peterborough, as King Edgar in a charter dated 972 confirmed it to that monastery.

Medieval
At the Domesday survey in 1086, Kettering manor is listed as held by the Abbey of Peterborough, the church owning 10 hides of land. Kettering was valued at £11, with land for 16 ploughs. There were 107 acres of meadow, 3 of woodland, 2 mills, 31 villans with 10 ploughs and 1 female slave.

The nearby stately home of Boughton House, sometimes described as the 'English Versailles', has for centuries been the seat of the Dukes of Buccleuch, major landowners in Kettering and most of the surrounding villages; along with the Watsons of Rockingham Castle, the two families were joint lords of the manor of Kettering.

Little is known of the origins of the church, its first known priest becoming rector in 1219–20. The chancel is in the Early Decorated style of about 1300, the main fabric of the building being mostly Perpendicular, having been rebuilt in the mid 15th century (its tower and spire being remarkably similar to the tower and spire of St Peter's Oundle). Whether the current building replaced an earlier church on the site is unknown. Two medieval wall paintings, one of two angels with feathered wings, and one of a now faded saint, can still be seen inside the church.

The charter for Kettering's market was granted to the Bishop of Peterborough by Henry III in 1227.

17th century
In June 1607 at the nearby village of Newton, the Newton Rebellion broke out, causing a brief uprising known as the Midland Revolt, which involved several nearby villages. Protesting at land enclosures at Newton and Pytchley by local landlords the Treshams, on 8 June a pitched battle took place between Levellers – many from Kettering, Corby and particularly Weldon, – and local gentry and their servants (local militias having refused the call to arms). Approximately 40–50 local men are said to have been killed and the ringleaders hanged, drawn and quartered. The Newton rebellion represents one of the last times that the English peasantry and the gentry were in open conflict.

By the 17th century the town was a centre for woollen cloth.

Recent history

The present town grew in the 19th century with the development of the boot and shoe industry, for which Northamptonshire as a whole became famous. Many large homes in both the Headlands and Rockingham Road were built for factory owners, while terraced streets provided accommodation for the workers. The industry has markedly declined since the 1970s, large footwear-manufacturers such as Dolcis, Freeman, Hardy and Willis, Frank Wright and Timpsons, having left the town or closed down in the face of stiff overseas competition, while others have outsourced their production to lower-cost countries. Only two smaller footwear-businesses remain.

William Carey, born in 1761 at Paulerspury, spent his early life in Kettering before leaving for India as a missionary in 1793. Carey Mission House and Carey Street were named after him. Andrew Fuller helped Carey found the Baptist Missionary Society and he is remembered in the Fuller Church and Fuller Street. In 1803 William Knibb was born in Market Street and became a missionary and emancipator of slaves; he is commemorated by the Knibb Centre and Knibb Street. Toller Chapel and Toller Place take their names from two ministers, father and son, who preached in Kettering for a total of 100 years. The chapel was built in 1723 for those who since 1662 had been worshipping in secret.

Politics in Kettering has not always been a sedate affair: in 1835, a horrified Charles Dickens, then a young reporter for the Morning Chronicle, watched aghast as a Tory supporter on horseback, intent (along with others) on taking control of by-election proceedings, produced a loaded pistol and had to be restrained by his friends from committing murder. The ensuing riot between Tory and Whig supporters led Dickens in his article to form various opinions of Kettering and its voters, none of them complimentary.

After several false starts the Midland Railway opened Kettering railway station in 1857, providing a welcome economic stimulus to an ailing local economy, suffering as it was from the loss of wayfaring business since the introduction of railways nationwide. The line in 1857 ran through Kettering from Leicester to Hitchin, where it joined the Great Northern Railway. Trains ran from there into London King's Cross. The line was finally linked to London directly in 1868 when the Midland opened its own line from Bedford to London St Pancras.

John Bartholomew's 1887 Gazetteer of the British Isles described Kettering as:

Iron-ore quarrying began in the Kettering area, probably for the first time since Roman times, at Glendon to the north of the town in 1863. At that place the digging of a railway cutting had exposed the ore beds. Quarrying began a little north of what later became Glendon Junction on the west side of the main railway. The Glendon quarries continued in operation until 1980. The last ore was extracted a little to the east of the starting point on the west side of the A6003. Other quarries opened to the east, south and west of Kettering, all opening and closing at some time between 1875 and 1969. There were also two ironworks in or near the town which used local ore. The Cransley Ironworks stood on the north side of the A43 to the west of what is now the junction with the A14. It began smelting iron in 1877 and ceased production in 1959. The site later became a scrapyard. The Kettering Ironworks, on the west side of the main railway to the north of Rothwell Road, began smelting iron in 1878 and ceased production in 1959, though ore quarrying continued until 1961.

In 1921 Wicksteed Park, Britain's second-oldest theme park, was officially opened on the southern outskirts of the town.

The airfield was soon nicknamed "Grafton Undermud" in reference to the perceived English weather of "rain, rain and more rain". The first bombing raid – targeting the marshalling yards at Rouen in northern France – was led by Major Paul W. Tibbets, who in 1945 piloted Enola Gay, the B-29 Superfortress that dropped the atomic bomb on Hiroshima. Aircraft from Grafton Underwood dropped the 8th Air Force's first and last bombs of the Second World War.

Before Brexit in 2020, for the European Parliament, Kettering fell within the East Midlands constituency.

Governance

Local government

Since 2021 Kettering has been part of the North Northamptonshire unitary authority. It formerly fell within the areas of Northamptonshire County Council and Kettering Borough Council, which incorporated the small, satellite towns of Barton Seagrave, Burton Latimer, Desborough and Rothwell. The local council was initially based on the first floor of the Corn Exchange, a building designed by E. F. Law and completed in 1853; it relocated in 1964 to the former home of Kettering Grammar School in Bowling Green Road, a building designed by John Alfred Gotch in the Neoclassical style and completed in 1913.

In April 2021 the County Council, and the Borough of Kettering were abolished and replaced by the new unitary authority of North Northamptonshire, which covers the areas of the districts of Kettering, Corby, East Northamptonshire and Wellingborough. Elections for the new authorities were due to be held on 7 May 2020 but these were delayed due to the COVID-19 pandemic. 

Concurrent with these changes, the unparished area of Kettering became a civil parish which also gained some land from Cranford and Barton Seagrave, which enabled it to establish a new Town (parish) Council (thus eliminating the need for charter trustees). The new Kettering Town Council inherited the offices, mayoralty and coat of arms from the former borough council.

Kettering Constituency
Kettering is represented in parliament by a constituency of the same name, which is currently (as of June 2017) represented by Conservative MP Philip Hollobone, who gained the marginal constituency from former Labour MP Phil Sawford in the 2005 general election.

Economy

Kettering's economy was built on the boot and shoe industry. With the arrival of railways in the 19th century, industries such as engineering and clothing grew up. The clothing manufacturer Aquascutum built its first factory there in 1909. Kettering's economy is now based on service and distribution industries due to its central location and transport links.

Kettering's unemployment rate is amongst the lowest in the UK and has over 80% of its adults in full-time employment. It is home to a wide range of companies including Aryzta, Weetabix, Pegasus Software, RCI Europe, Timsons Ltd and Morrisons Distribution as well as Wicksteed Park, the United Kingdom's second oldest theme park, which now plays host to one and a quarter million visitors every season. It has a very large free playground area, which was built by Wicksteed Playscapes, who are based in Kettering; the company is the world's oldest-known playground producer.

Kettering General Hospital provides Acute and Accident & Emergency department services for north Northamptonshire including Corby and Wellingborough. With its new £20 million campus, 16,000 students and 800 staff, Tresham College of Further and Higher Education is a significant employer in the region.

The former police station and social club on London Road has been closed down and as of 2020 the site is for sale. Northamptonshire Police have an enquiry desk situated within the Kettering Municipal Offices.

Kettering Business Park, a recent and current commercial property development undertaken by Buccleuch Property is situated on the A43/A6003, on the north side of Kettering. Many office buildings are being built as part of the project as well as a leisure sector with a new hotel. Many large distribution warehouses have been constructed in the area, creating thousands of jobs for the local economy. 

Kettering's Heritage Quarter houses the Manor House Museum and the Alfred East Gallery. The magnificent Boughton House, Queen Eleanor cross and the 1597 Triangular Lodge are local landmarks within the borough. Sir Thomas Tresham was a devout Catholic who was imprisoned for his beliefs. When he was released he built Triangular Lodge to defy his prosecutors and secretly declare his faith.

The British sitcom Peep Show has various scenes located in Kettering owing to the head office of JLB, the company which employs lead character Mark Corrigan, being located there.

Regeneration
In March 2007, a project was revealed to refurbish and bring new leisure and shopping to the town centre, including water features, public art, sculptures, street furniture, trees, plants and an innovative pavement lighting scheme.

Education
Primary Schools in Kettering include St Peter's School, an independent school, Park Road School, St Thomas More Catholic School, St Edward’s Catholic Primary School, St Andrew's Church of England School, Hawthorn School, Greenfields Primary, St Mary's, Millbrook Junior School and a number of others associated with Secondary Academies. A new Church of England primary school, Hayfield Cross, is opening in September 2015.

Kettering has four secondary schools, each with the ability to take on pupils after the age of 16 to allow pupils to complete their A-Levels and BTEC Diplomas. The four secondary schools located in the town are Bishop Stopford School, Kettering Science Academy, Kettering Buccleuch Academy and Southfield School for Girls. Both the Kettering Science Academy and Kettering Buccleuch Academy have become academies in recent years and both academies are joined to separate primary schools to allow for an easier transition from Key Stage 2 to Key Stage 3.

Latimer Arts College is also in the area and is located in the nearby village of Barton Seagrave. The school also has a sixth form facility, but no primary schools are specifically linked to them.

Kettering is also home to one of Tresham College of Further and Higher Education's three campuses. Tresham allows full and part-time students over the age of 16 to study a range of vocational courses such as Hairdressing and Beauty Therapy, ICT, Hospitality and Catering and Motor Vehicle Technology.  Tresham College also offers Access to Higher Education courses and undergraduate courses in association with the University of Bedfordshire and University of Northampton

Sport
The multi-purpose sports and business facility at the Kettering Conference Centre provides both a leisure centre, health club, children's activity and conference centre all in one venue. It is also the home to Volleyball England's National Volleyball Centre.

Football
Kettering Town is the town's football club, who as of the 2021–22 season play in the National League North, the sixth tier of English football. Kettering Town played their home matches at Rockingham Road in the town until 2011. Following spells at Nene Park in Irthlingborough and Steel Park in Corby, the team currently plays at Latimer Park in Burton Latimer.

Rugby
Kettering is home to Kettering Rugby Football Club (KRFC), located in Waverley Road on the eastern side of the town. After a period of playing under Uppingham Public School Rules the club formally adopted RFU rules in 1875 and quickly became a significant participant in both the local community and the fast-developing Rugby scene in the East Midlands. In the early days games were played on a number of sites including farmers' fields and council-owned grounds. It was during this period, prior to adopting a home of their own, that the club developed its high profile in the town.

Other
A short lived greyhound racing track was opened on 4 July 1930 and raced on Friday evenings. The racing was independent (not affiliated to the sports governing body the National Greyhound Racing Club) and was known as a flapping track, which was the nickname given to independent tracks. It is not known how long the track traded.

Transport

Roads
The A14 skirts the west and south of the town, links the town with the A45 dual carriageway, M1 and M6 motorways. The A6003 links Kettering to Corby. The A43 links Kettering with Corby and the county town of Northampton and the A509 (Kettering/Wellingborough Road) links Kettering with Wellingborough.

Buses
In April 1986, the bus station was relocated away from the market area to the Newland Street entrance of the modern Newlands shopping centre. This caused a fatal decline in market trade, although buses were re-allocated there in April 1987 before closing again in September 1989. A smaller version of a bus station was also closed in May 1999 and so buses just served the library and Newlands Shopping Centre; however, since May 2010, all buses now serve the new Horsemarket bus interchange and they no longer serve the library. New bus stops have been installed around the railway station and The Headlands.

The town is served by bus services operated by Stagecoach Midlands with the following routes:
Corby X1 Corby- Kettering – Burton Latimer – Finedon – Wellingborough
Kettering 15 Stamford road – Kettering – Kettering Train Station – Highfield road- Tesco
Kettering 19 Kettering – Ise lodge
Kettering 49 Rushden – Higham Ferrers – Irthlingborough – Finedon – Kettering – Brambleside
Kettering 50 Bedford town centre (bus station) – Rushden – Higham Ferrers – Irthlingborough – Finedon – Kettering- Brambleside
Kettering X43/43 Market Harborough – Desborough – Rothwell – Kettering
Kettering 19 Kettering – Rothwell – Desborough – Rushton – Corby
Kettering X4 Gold Peterborough – Oundle – Corby – Kettering – Wellingborough – Northampton
Kettering X43/43 Northampton – Moulton – Broughton – Kettering – Rothwell – Desborough – Market Harborough
Kettering 39 Kettering – Mawsley – Moulton – Northampton
Kettering 34 Wellingborough – Little Harrowden – Orlingbury – Pytchley – Kettering – Lake Avenue

The town is also served by a local bus service run by Centrebus Northamptonshire, with the following routes:
Kettering 8 Corby – Stanion – Geddington – Weekley – Kettering
Kettering 16 Kettering – Cranford – Thrapston – Raunds
Kettering 34 Kettering – Wellingborough

Rail

St Pancras also provides an interchange with the Eurostar service to France and Belgium. Kettering is linked to Corby, Leicester, Nottingham, Derby and Sheffield to the north and Wellingborough, Bedford and Luton to the south. With its good rail links, a large and growing commuter population takes advantage of Kettering's position on the Midland Main Line railway.

Air
Five large UK airports are within 2 hours' drive of the town, these being Heathrow, Luton, East Midlands, Birmingham and Stansted. Luton can be reached directly by train, while East Midlands and Stansted can be reached by one change at Leicester.

Notable people

Climate
Kettering experiences an oceanic climate (Köppen climate classification) which is similar to most of the British Isles.

Nearby places
Kettering's nearest towns are Desborough, Burton Latimer and Rothwell, with the larger towns of Corby and Wellingborough.

Town twinning
Kettering is twinned with:
  Kettering, Ohio, United States
  Lahnstein, Germany
  Kettering, Tasmania, Australia

See also

 Kettering Ironstone Railway
 Kettering Grammar School

References

External links

 Kettering local free business directory, local news, events and offers
 Kettering Weather Station
 Kettering Evening Telegraph
 Kettering Borough Council

 
Towns in Northamptonshire
Market towns in Northamptonshire
North Northamptonshire